Barry Brook may refer to:

Barry Brook (scientist) (born 1974), Australian earth scientist
Barry S. Brook (1918–1997), American musicologist

See also
Barry Brooks (disambiguation)